Theodore & Co is an English musical comedy in two acts with a book by H. M. Harwood and George Grossmith Jr. based on the French comedy Théodore et Cie by Paul Armont and Nicolas Nancey, with music by Ivor Novello and Jerome Kern and lyrics by Adrian Ross and Clifford Grey.  It was produced by Grossmith and Edward Laurillard and directed by Austen Hurgon, opening at the Gaiety Theatre on 19 September 1916 and running for 503 performances.  It starred Grossmith, Fred Leslie and Leslie Henson.

Theodore & Co opened during World War I in the same year as two other tremendously successful shows in London: Chu Chin Chow and The Bing Boys are Here, and the successful The Happy Day.  Audiences wanted light and uplifting entertainment during the war, and these shows delivered it.

This show established Ivor Novello as a theatrical composer and was Kern's first show in London. Novello's songs from the show include "What A Duke Should Be" and "Oh, How I Want To Marry".

Roles and original cast

Bompas, 24th Duke of Shetland – Davy Burnaby
Pony Twitchen (of the "Crimson Comics") – Leslie Henson
Rt. Hon. George Wye (Minister of Movies) – Fred Leslie
Mr. Blissett (A Husband) – Frederick Morant
Cosmo Legallos – Henri Leoni
Mr. Satterthwaite (of Dowton) – Victor Gouriet
Crump – Robert Nainby
Delatour (Manager of the New Casino) – Frank Hector
A Man with a Blue Envelope – Ralph Roberts
The Emir of Baluchistan – J. Grande
His Interpreter – Fred Raynham
Sir Basil Bowlwell, R.H.G. – James Thomas
Lord Theodore Wragge – George Grossmith Jr.
Lady Theresa Wye – Gladys Homfrey
Lady Pansy (the Duke's daughter) – Madge Saunders
Hon. Sapphire Blissett – Julia James
Fudge Robinson (of the "Crimson Comics") – Peggy Kurton
Alma, "The Statue of Liberty " – Irene Richards
Cleo, "The Tiptoe Queen" – Adrah Fair
Lady Diana Camden – Ivey Collette/Doris Stocker
Lady Moya – Violet Ashton
Molly Pershore – Barbara Dunbar
Marjorie Carstairs – Connie Guy
Lady Lilly – Vera Davis
Lady Billy – Lilian  Caldicott
Elizabeth Anne – Margaret Gamble
Mary Ellen – Maudie Dunham
Ethel Emily (Mr. Satterthwaite's daughter) – Joyce Barbour
Rosa Maud (Mr. Satterthwaite's daughter) – Dorothy King
Matilda Kate – Cherry Constant
Harriett Jane – Mercia Swinburne
Charwoman – Muriel Barney

Musical numbers

Act I
Chorus – "Isn't there a crowd everywhere" (Words by Adrian Ross. Music by Ivor Novello)
Song – "What a Duke should be" (Words by Clifford Grey. Music by Novello)
Duet – "I'll make myself at home" (Words by Ross. Music by Novello)
Song – "I'm getting such a big girl now" (Words by Grey. Music by Philip Braham)
Song & Dance – "Ev'ry little girl can teach me something new" (Words by Ross. Music by Novello)
Song – "The Candy Girls" (Words by Ross.  Music by Novello)
Sextet – "You'd better not wait for him" (Words by Grey. Music by Novello)
Finale, Act I. – "He's going to call on Baby Grand" (Music by Novello)

Act II
Chorus – "We are Theodore & Co." (Words by Ross. Music by Novello)
Song – "Three Hundred and Sixty-five days" (Words by Grey. Music by Jerome D. Kern)
Song – "That 'Come hither' look" (Words by Grey. Music by Kern)
Song " Any old where" (Words by Grey. Music by Novello)
Song & Chorus – "The Casino Music Hall" (Words by Grey. Music by Kern)
Dance – "Valse Saracenne" (Music by Novello)
Song – "My friend John" (Words by Grey. Music by Novello)
Duet – "All that I want is somebody to love me" (Words by Grey. Music by Kern)
Finale (Music by Novello)
Supplementary song
"My Second Childhood" (Words by David Burnaby & Eric Blore. Music by Braham)

Notes

External links
Theodore & Co at the Guide to Musical Theatre
Excerpt of Edward Packe's diary showing that he went to London to see Theodore & Co a half dozen times in 1917
Biography of Ivor Novello

1916 musicals
West End musicals
Musicals by Ivor Novello
Plays by H. M. Harwood
British musicals